, Uganda maintained the following military training institutions:

 Bihanga Military Training School - Located at Bihanga, in Ibanda District, Western Region.
 Kalama Armoured Warfare Training School - Located at Kabamba, Mubende District, Central Region
 National Leadership Institute - Located at Kyankwanzi, Kyankwanzi District
 Oliver Tambo School of Leadership - Located at Kaweweta, Nakaseke District
 Uganda Special Forces School - Located at Kaweweta, Nakaseke District
 Uganda Military Air Force Academy - Located at Nakasongola in Nakasongola District
 Uganda Military Engineering College - Located at Lugazi, Buikwe District
 Uganda Junior Staff College - Located at Qaddafi Barracks, Jinja
 Uganda Military Academy - Located at Kabamba, Mubende District
 Uganda Senior Command and Staff College - Located at Kimaka, Jinja
 Uganda Urban Warfare Training School - Located at Singo, Nakaseke District
 National Defence College, Uganda, Located in Njeru, Buikwe District
 Karugutu Training School - Located at Karugutu, Ntoroko District.
 School of Military Intelligence and Security - Located at Nakasongola Military Complex, Nakasongola District.

See also
 Uganda People's Defense Force

References

External links
  Website of the Uganda Ministry of Defence
  Armored Warfare Training School Located In Kabamba

 
Uganda People's Defence Force
Uganda, military
Military